The Essential (2003) is a greatest hits album by Jethro Tull, digitally remastered. The songs included and their order are the same as Tull's first greatest hits album, M.U. – The Best of Jethro Tull. It is not to be confused with the similarly named Jethro Tull compilation "Essential", released in 2011.

Track listing
 "Teacher" – 4:07
 "Aqualung" – 6:34
 "Thick as a Brick (Edit No.1)" – 3:01
 "Bungle in the Jungle" – 3:34
 "Locomotive Breath" – 4:23
 "Fat Man" – 2:50
 "Living in the Past" – 3:18
 "A Passion Play Edit #8" – 3:28
 "Skating Away on the Thin Ice of the New Day" – 4:02
 "Rainbow Blues" – 3:37
 "Nothing Is Easy" – 4:23

Personnel
 Ian Anderson – flute, vocals, saxophone, acoustic guitar (all tracks)
 Martin Barre – electric guitar (all tracks)
 Glenn Cornick – bass (tracks 1, 7, 11)
 Clive Bunker – drums (tracks 1, 2, 5 – 7, 11)
 John Evan – Hammond organ, piano, synthesizers (tracks 1 – 5, 8 – 10 )
 Jeffrey Hammond – bass (tracks 2, 3, 4, 5, 8, 9, 10)
 Barriemore Barlow – drums, percussion, glockenspiel (tracks 3, 4, 8 – 10)
 David Palmer – orchestration, orchestra conducting

References

External links
 Jethro Tull - The Essential (2003) album review by Wade Kergan, credits & releases at AllMusic.com
 Jethro Tull - The Essential (2003) album releases & credits at Discogs.com
 Jethro Tull - The Essential (2003) album credits & user reviews at ProgArchives.com
 Jethro Tull - The Essential (2003) / M.U. - The Best of Jethro Tull (1976) album to be listened as stream at Play.Spotify.com

Jethro Tull (band) compilation albums
2003 compilation albums
Chrysalis Records compilation albums